Phoenix Wilder and the Great Elephant Adventure is a 2017 Canadian,South African adventure film, written and directed by Richard Boddington the film stars Elizabeth Hurley, Hlomla Dandala, Sam Ashe Arnold and Tertius Meintjes.

Plot 
Phoenix Wilder is a 13-year-old American boy living in foster care in Texas since the death of both of his parents in an automobile accident. His existence is an unhappy one, as he is not well treated by his foster family. Phoenix receives word that he is to live with his only surviving relative, his Aunt Sarah who lives in Africa with her husband, “Uncle Jack.” Upon arrival in Africa Phoenix quickly falls in love with his new surroundings, it’s a paradise for a 13-year-old boy. His Aunt Sarah is incredibly kind and showers Phoenix with the love that has been missing in his life.

While out on safari with his uncle, Phoenix becomes lost from the rest of the party, he must quickly learn to survive in the African bush while the search for him goes on. Phoenix stumbles across a giant bull elephant who is caught in a net trap, and successfully frees the animal. The two become fast friends, Phoenix names the elephant Indlovu. Indlovu offers Phoenix protection from the lions and hyena that roam the African plains, and it’s not long before Phoenix learns to ride Indlovu.

Phoenix and Indlovu come across a dead elephant with its tusks sawed off. Phoenix can’t comprehend the horror of the scene. Phoenix quickly becomes familiar with elephant poaching in Africa and decides that he and Indlovu must put a stop to the killing.
Phoenix and Indlovu stumble across the main poacher camp, which is large and filled with armed men. Phoenix sees that the poachers have captured a female elephant and her baby, which turn out to be Indlovu’s mate and baby. Phoenix vows to return and save them both.
Indlovu and Phoenix come across some poachers hunting in the bush, Phoenix and Indlovu chase the poachers and scare them off. They soon find more poachers at a small camp. They storm in and destroy the camp. The poachers report back to their boss, Blake Von Stein, what happened to them. Von Stein orders all the men out to find Phoenix and the elephant.

Phoenix is finally captured by the poachers and held prisoner. During his time with the poachers as their prisoner Phoenix finds a picture of Uncle Jack with the elephant poachers. He is devastated to discover that Uncle Jack is involved with the poachers. Phoenix is finally rescued by Indlovu who sneaks into the camp under cover of darkness and frees Phoenix. The search for Phoenix continues by Aunt Sarah, his uncle, and Col Ibori, who is also leading the rangers against the elephant poachers. During the final confrontation with the poachers Indlovu and Phoenix cause major damage to the poachers camp and equipment. During the struggle Phoenix frees the captured elephants, the elephant family is reunited.

Most of the poachers run away except for Blake Von Steien, who tracks Phoenix and Indlovu with his rifle. Von Stein finally confronts Phoenix and Indlovu.During the confrontation, Indlovu disarms Von Stein, and Uncle Jack arrives just in time to grab the gun and hold Von Stein at bay. Col Ibori soon arrives with his men, arrests Von Stein, and takes him away. Phoenix says a tearful good-bye to Indlovu and his elephant family as they head off into the wilderness together in an area free of elephant poachers.

Cast 
 Elizabeth Hurley as Aunt Sarah
 Sam Ashe Arnold as Phoenix Wilder
 Tertius Meintjes as Uncle Jack
 Hlomla Dandala as Col. Ibori

Filming 

Principal photography took place in South Africa at a reserve in Bela Bela during the month of May in 2017. Boddington had the entire cast and crew stay in a remote location, so that no elephants would need to be transported for the production.

Release 
The film premiered at the 2017 Durban International Film Festival and later opened to 725 U.S screens on April 16, 2018. On October 23, 2018, the film was released in the USA on DVD, Digital, and On-Demand by Lionsgate under the title, An Elephant's Journey.

References

External links
 
 

2017 films
2017 drama films
2010s adventure drama films
Canadian adventure drama films
English-language Canadian films
Films shot in South Africa
2010s English-language films
2010s Canadian films